Elfros is a village in the Canadian province of Saskatchewan within the Rural Municipality of Elfros No. 307 and Census Division No. 10. It is northeast of Regina and southeast of the Quill Lakes at the junction of Highway 16 and Highway 35. It was the hometown of the protagonist in the 2018 Canadian horror film Archons.

History 
Elfros was first settled by Icelandic immigrants, and many of the present inhabitants are of Icelandic descent. A post office was opened in 1909. Elfros incorporated as a village on December 1, 1909.

From the Icelandic Pioneer Memorial in Elfros comes the following quotation.

Demographics 

See also

 List of communities in Saskatchewan
 List of villages in Saskatchewan

References

Villages in Saskatchewan
Elfros No. 307, Saskatchewan
Division No. 10, Saskatchewan
Places in Canada settled by Icelanders
Icelandic settlements in Saskatchewan